Hrušica is a settlement at the foothills of the Gorjanci Range in the City Municipality of Novo Mesto in southeastern Slovenia. The area is part of the traditional region of Lower Carniola and is now included in the Southeast Slovenia Statistical Region.

The local church, built on the southern outskirts of the village, is dedicated to Saint James and belongs to the Parish of Stopiče. It was a medieval building that was extensively restyled in the Baroque style in the 17th century.

References

External links
Hrušica on Geopedia

Populated places in the City Municipality of Novo Mesto